Nikolos, also known as Nikolonisi, Nikolo Nisi, and Agios Antonios, is an island close to the northeastern coast of Crete. Administratively it comes within the Agios Nikolaos municipality in Lasithi.

References

Uninhabited islands of Crete
Landforms of Lasithi
Islands of Greece